The 2021 Copa Paulino Alcantara was the third edition of the Copa Paulino Alcantara, the domestic football cup competition of the Philippines. United City (then called Ceres–Negros) won the previous edition in 2019, but withdrew from the 2021 edition. Kaya–Iloilo won their second title by defeating the Azkals Development Team 1–0 in the final. All matches were played at the PFF National Training Center in Carmona, Cavite.

Scheduling
The Copa Paulino Alcantara was not held in the 2020 season due to the COVID-19 pandemic, with the league tournament held under a bubble format.

There were initially plans to hold the cup tournament earlier in the year, but it was cancelled in March 2021 (along with several postponements to the 2021 Philippines Football League). The tournament was revived once again in October 2021, after the league season was cancelled, and now scheduled to take place during November 7–19.

Participating clubs
All six clubs in the 2020 Philippines Football League were eligible to participate in the tournament. Cebu which was given a provisional license and also eligible to join. However the PFF added that only clubs willing to spend for their participation would take part in the tournament. Maharlika Manila decided not to enter. United City withdrew after the draw due to an undisclosed legal dispute filed against the club when it was still Ceres–Negros and under a different management. The club withdrew since it believe it could affect the nominations of the other clubs to the 2022 AFC Cup had they entered.

Format

Competition
The Copa Paulino Alcantara will consist of two rounds; the group stage and the knock-out stage. For the group stage, the six participating clubs were divided into two groups of three. The top two teams from each group will advance to the semifinals. There will also be a third place play-off for the losing semifinalists. The third placed teams in the group stage were supposed to play-off in the Plate final, but this was cancelled due to an absence of a third team in Group A after United City's withdrawal.

The winners will qualify for the 2022 AFC Champions League qualifying play-offs. Kaya–Iloilo, Mendiola and Stallion Laguna are eligible to qualify as holders of an AFC club license.

The tiebreaker used for the tournament is as follows: lowest number of red cards accumulated, lowest number of yellow cards or through a coin toss.

Draw
The draw was held on October 27, 2021.

Group stage

Group A

Group B

Knock-out stage

Semi-finals

Third place play-off

Final

Top scorers

Awards

Source:

References

Copa Paulino Alcantara seasons
2021 in Philippine football